Gollumia is a genus of gastropods belonging to the family Pristilomatidae.

The species of this genus inhabits terrestrial environments.

Species:

Gollumia applanata 
Gollumia filocincta 
Gollumia torumbilicata

References

Pristilomatidae
Organisms named after Tolkien and his works